Karun is a river in Iran.

Karun may also refer to:

Places
 Karun, Fars
 Karun, Hormozgan
 Karun, Khuzestan
 Karun, Kohgiluyeh and Boyer-Ahmad
 Karun, Mazandaran
 Karun County, in Khuzestan Province
 Karun District, in Isfahan Province

Other uses
 Karun, lead vocalist of Kenyan hip hop group Camp Mulla
 Karun Patel, a fictional character in the 2021 film Eternals
 Karun or Krun, the Mandaean lord of the underworld

See also